Dustin Latimer (born May 9, 1981) is an American inline skater, born in Salt Lake City, Utah. He resides in Phoenix, Arizona.

Skating career
Dustin started inline skating at the age of 9, using ramps built by his father.
Dustin signed his first professional contract at age of 15 with Euro Funk clothing and Medium Wheels.

In 1997, he was signed to the Universal Skate Design (USD) pro team along with Jon Julio, Arlo Eisenberg, Champion Baumstimler, Kevin Gillian and Josh Petty. His first pro skate was released the same year. The USD (Classic) Throne I which featured his name were the first customizable skates.
During his time at USD, Dustin had 6 pro skates released:
 USD Classic Throne I, Boot: dark green, Cuff: dark grey, Soulplate: black, 1997
 USD Classic Throne II, Boot: light grey, Cuff: dark grey, Soulplate: dark grey, 1999
 USD Psirus I, Boot: light and medium grey, Cuff: dark grey, Soulplate: white, 2000
 USD Psirus II, Boot: light brown and dark grey, Cuff: light brown, Soulplate: gold, 2001
 USD Throne UFS I, Boot: black, Cuff: dark grey, Soulplate: white and dark grey, 2002
 USD Throne UFS II, Boot: black, Cuff: dark brown, Soulplate: gold and dark brown, 2003

During this time Dustin was also riding for England Clothing which was started by his friend and USD teammate Jon Julio. Other notable England Clothing professional skaters were Jon Julio, Josh Petty, Rachard Johnson and Dominic Sagona.

In the year 2000, USD released the influential team video "Coup De Tat". This video edited by Javad "Joe" Navran featured the all USD Team: Brian Shima, Kevin Gillian, Josh Petty, Jeff Frederick, Champion Baumstimler, Jon Julio.

The same year (2000), Dustin and Shane Coburn launched the Mindgame wheel company. Mindgame rapidly gained notoriety in part to their premiere team video "Brain Fear Gone" which was edited by both Coburn and Latimer. This video featured Brian Shima, Jon Elliot, Omar Wysong, Dustin Latimer and introduced Aaron Feinberg.
Dustin had a total of 7 pro wheels released under Mindgame:
 Edition I, 55mm/90A, Print: One eye logo, Mindgame logo and Dustin Latimer name scattered, 2000
 Edition II, XXmm/XXA, Print: Lines describing a shelter around bearing socket, mindkind logo with eye logo head on the right, and M logo at the bottom, 2001
 Edition III, 55mm/88A, Print: 4 quadrants, one with eye logo, one with DL letters, one with M logo, one with 55/88, 2002
 Edition IV, 55mm/90A, Print: DUSTIN LATIMER block letters, 2003
 Edition V, 54mm/92A, Print: One big eye logo around the bearing socket, 2004
 Edition VI, 54mm/92A, Print: Three rows of small eyes logos doing the circumference, 2005
 Edition VII, 54mm/92A, Print: One big eye logo around the bearing socket surrounded with small eyes logo with an enlighting eye logo at the top, 2006

In 2003, Dustin left USD to start the ambitious and revolutionary project Xsjado (pronounce it "Shadow").
Xsjado skates were developed on the base of a snowboard binding fixed on an inline skate frame.
Dustin had 2 pro skates released during his time with Xsjado:
 Xsjado Dustin Latimer 1, Boot: black and grey, Cuff: brown, Soulplate: black and brown, 2003
 Xsjado Dustin Latimer 2: , Boot: green and grey, Cuff: light grey, Soulplate: light grey, 2006

In 2008, Dustin was signed back on the USD All Star Team along with Kevin Gillian and Aaron Feinberg.

Dustin no longer skates for the USD Team nor for Xsjado Team,

Film career
Dustin has appeared in several videos such as:
 Children of the Night, 1996
 Toys Beneath our Feet, 1997
 One Nation, 1997
 Film of the Year, 1997
 Elements, 1997
 Espionage, 1998
 F.O.R. (Future Of Rollerblading), 1998
 Medium Team, 1998
 Millennium, 1999
 Volume, 1999
 Elements II, 1999
 Coup de Tat, 2000
 Brain Fear Gone, 2000
 Words, 2003
 Bang, 2004
 Feet, 2005
 Accidental Machines, 2006

Personal life
Dustin has a son and practices yoga, rock climbing and working on cars.

References

External links
 Interview from http://www.angelfire.com/oh5/dublinskatepark/dustin.html
 Interview from http://www.frenchyfries.fr/index.php?2009/06/22/104-interview-dustin-latimer-a-life-of-rolling
 Interview from http://mushroomblading.com/articles/dustin.php
 https://web.archive.org/web/20141104183633/http://bladearchive.net/
 Coup De Tat (USD), Produced by Future Prospects, Joe Navran editor, starring: Brian Shima, Kevin Gillian, Josh Petty, Jeff Frederick, Champion Baumstimler, Dustin Latimer, Jon Julio, VHS media, 2000 Rollingvideos.com
 Words (Mindgame), Produced by Trendkiller/Mindgame, Dustin Latimer and Shane Coburn editors, starring: Aaron Feinberg, Chris Farmer, Dustin Latimer, DVD media, 2003 Rollingvideos.com

1981 births
Living people
Aggressive inline skaters
Sportspeople from Salt Lake City